The Meteors are a British psychobilly band

The Meteors may also refer to:

 The Meteors (Dutch band)
 Meteor Music Awards
 The New Zealand band led by Max Merritt